Sir James Palmer (January 1585 – 15 March 1658) was an English Member of Parliament and Chancellor of the Order of the Garter.

Origins
He was the third surviving son of Sir Thomas Palmer, 1st Baronet of Wingham, Kent and the younger brother of Roger Palmer, MP.

Career

Well educated, he moved to court and by 1609 had become a servant of the Earl of Montgomery. Under his patronage he was elected a Member of Parliament for Queenborough in 1621. In 1622, he was appointed a Groom of the Bedchamber to King James I and in 1629 a Gentleman Usher of the Privy Chamber to his son King Charles I, to whom he donated the Wilton Diptych.

He purchased Dorney Court in Buckinghamshire from his wife's family in 1624. In 1626, he was elected a Member of Parliament for Canterbury, sitting until 1628. He was knighted by King Charles I in 1629, and, in 1631, entered Gray's Inn to study law.

He deputised for Sir Thomas Roe as Chancellor of the Order of the Garter from 1638 to 1641, following him as Chancellor in his own right. He was also an artist and miniature painter, an adviser to the royal collection, and governor of the Royal Mortlake Tapestry Works from 1638. His portrait of James I is in the Victoria & Albert Museum collection, his portrait of the Earl of Southampton in the Fitzwilliam Collection, Cambridge and his portrait of the Earl of Northampton is in the Royal Collection.

Marriages and children

He married twice; firstly to Martha Garrard, a daughter of Sir William Garrard of Dorney Court, by whom he had 2 sons and 2 daughters, and secondly to Catherine Herbert, a daughter of William Herbert, 1st Baron Powis of Powis Castle, Montgomery, and the widow of Sir Robert Vaughan of Llwydiarth, Montgomery, by whom he had a further 3 sons and a daughter.

References

1585 births
1658 deaths
Members of Gray's Inn
English MPs 1621–1622
English MPs 1626
Chancellors of the Order of the Garter
Younger sons of baronets
People from Wingham, Kent
English knights
Knights Bachelor